Target: The Corruptors! is an American crime drama series starring Stephen McNally that aired on ABC from September 29, 1961 to September 21, 1962, from 10 to 11 p.m. on Fridays. The Navy Motion Picture Service also made some episodes available on 16 mm film for showing aboard ship to personnel of the United States Navy. The series's title in syndication was Expose.

Plot 
Paul Marion is a newspaper columnist, and Jack Flood is his assistant. Together they investigate criminal activity and expose organized rackets and corruption. In each episode they probe a different type of illegal activity such as bookmaking, charity scams, prostitution, and protection rackets.

The New York Times wrote that the first episode "indicated that the stress here may be more on violence and sensationalism than on the social phenomenon under study."

Lester Vielie, one of the series's creators, said that the program was an attempt to make a different kind of series for television, one that combined "the resources of investigative journalism with the drama of television". He added that involving viewers in contemporary situations that affected people's lives would be a unique approach for a dramatic series. After the show ended, Vielie had no explanation for its cancellation by ABC, especially considering its high Nielsen ratings.

Cast

Main cast

 Stephen McNally as Paul Marino
 Robert Harland as Jack Flood
 Jo Helton as Rose Vaclavic (recurring role)
 Dennis Cross as Reicher (recurring role)

Guest stars

 Ed Asner
 Parley Baer 
 Martin Balsam
 Ed Begley
 Robert Burton
 William Conrad
 Michael Constantine
 Wendell Corey 
 Robert Culp
 Barbara Eden
 Jack Elam
 Peter Falk
 Felicia Farr 
 Constance Ford
 Rodolfo Hoyos Jr.
 Alan Hale, Jr.
 David Janssen
 Brian Keith
 Ray Kellogg
 Jess Kirkpatrick
 Jack Klugman
 Shirley Knight 

 Bethel Leslie 
 Robert Loggia
 Frank Lovejoy
 Walter Matthau
 Vic Morrow 
 Jeanette Nolan
 James Nusser
 Edmond O'Brien
 Dan O'Herlihy
 Warren Oates
 Suzanne Pleshette
 Gilman Rankin
 Gena Rowlands
 Penny Santon
 Simon Scott
 Robert F. Simon
 William Tannen
 Kelly Thordsen
 Robert Vaughn
 Virginia Vincent
 Jack Warden
 Keenan Wynn
 Hayden Rorke

Production
The series was produced by Four Star Television. The producers were Leonard Ackerman and John Burrows. Gene Roddenberry wrote for at least one episode. Sydney Pollack directed the episode "The Wreckers".

In the opening episode, cameras used extreme closeups to show faces "in a way that projects them almost physically and uncomfortably into the living room."

Senate hearing
Target: The Corruptors! was considered as part of an investigation by the Subcommittee to Investigate Juvenile Delinquency of the Committee on the Judiciary of the United States Senate. On July 28, 1961, a hearing focused on violence and crime on television, especially with regard to their depiction when many children were watching.

Episodes

References

External links 
 

1961 American television series debuts
1962 American television series endings
American Broadcasting Company original programming
1960s American crime drama television series
Black-and-white American television shows
English-language television shows
Television series by Four Star Television
Television series by 20th Century Fox Television
Television shows set in New York City
American detective television series